Vladykino is a station on the Little Ring of the Moscow Railway located at Otradnoye District and Marfino District, North-Eastern Administrative Okrug, Moscow. The station is served by Moscow Central Circle of the Moscow Metro.

Transfer
The station offers a transfer for Vladykino of Serpukhovsko-Timiryazevskaya Line.

Gallery

External links 
 mkzd.ru

Moscow Metro stations
Railway stations in Russia opened in 2016
Moscow Central Circle stations